This is a list of films produced by the Tollywood film industry based in Madras(Chennai) in the 1930s. In those days most of the actors actresses were singers, they were also stage performers. Full movie used to be of 3 hours++, few dialogues. No censorship, no regulatory authority.

References

External links
 Earliest Telugu language films at IMDb.com (1 to 50)

1930s
Telugu
Telugu films